This article is a catalog of actresses and models who have appeared on the cover of Harper's Bazaar Germany, the German edition of Harper's Bazaar magazine, starting with the magazine's first issue in February 2014.

1985

1986

1987

1988

1989

1990

1991

1992

2014

2015

2016

2017

2018

2019

2020

External links
 Harper's Bazaar Germany
 Harper's Bazaar Germany on Models.com

Germany